God Calling is a 2018 Nigerian Christian drama film written and directed by Bodunrin Sasore. The film stars Kabiri Fubara, Ademola Adedoyin, Zainab Balogun and Richard Mofe Damijo in the lead roles. The film made history in 2018 by preceding its cinema entry nationwide with over 10 million views of its teaser since its release and also featured on CNN African Voices.

Synopsis 
It is a story of redemption that looks at the life of Sade, her family and her faith through the lens of an unconventional encounter with God in this modern age.

Cast 

 Ademola Adedoyin as Angel
 Zainab Balogun as Sade
 Seun Ajayi as Tope
 Patrick Diabuah as  Pastor
 Eku Edewor as Asa
 Diana Egwuatu as Lola
 Shawn Fasua as John
 Tina Mba as Sade's mother

References

External links 

 

2018 films
2018 drama films
English-language Nigerian films
Films shot in Nigeria
Nigerian drama films
Films about Christianity
2010s English-language films